Pipers Island, or Piper's Island, is the third-smallest map-named island in the River Thames, in England. It is on the Reading, Berkshire reach (the head of water above Caversham Lock). It is toward the edge of the central urban area of the town of Reading and connected by a gangway to Caversham Bridge, a road and pedestrian bridge that links that town to its left bank suburb of Caversham.

Use
Pipers Island has been hard-landscaped into a public house and restaurant, The Island, the surrounding decking of which is shared for restaurant use and moorings of boats, used for a boat hire and larger vessels running hourly cruises during the Summer months.  The banks of the island are today sheet metal topped with wooden decking. A protective rail guards the lower and somewhat smaller upper decks of the restaurant which are similar in design.

Access
The ait is the third-smallest of those named on official maps of the Thames. Maps show it has clearly approximately kept its footprint measurement of  shortly before the year 1900, though the few rounded corners of its then-boathouse use have been neatly squared since the restaurant's opening. It is accessed on foot by a footbridge and staircase (also known together as a gangway) that connects the island to the centre of Caversham Bridge. The smallest island with vehicular access on the river is almost double its size, Swan Island, London which is in Twickenham.

Family owners within the Livery Company of Watermen and Lightermen

It is known that in 1766 the Firework Ait, Windsor was likewise called Piper's Eyot and had another name before its later renaming.  Guinea Piper was a celebrated waterman at the time. One of Eton College's longboats was named after him - My Guinea's Lion. Another, Piper's Green was named after one of his watermen brothers Richard (known as Dick) or James (known as Jack) Piper and this eyot later came into the family's ownership where they plied a local boat repair trade.

Location
The ait is toward the edge of the central urban area of the town of Reading and connected by a gangway attached to the middle of the downstream stone balustrade of Caversham Bridge, a road bridge that links that town to its left bank suburb of Caversham, its closer bank.

See also
Islands in the River Thames

References

External links
 
 Island Bar and Restaurant web site
 

Geography of Reading, Berkshire
Islands of the River Thames